Cantando 2011 was the third season of Cantando por un Sueño, and the first season to be aired as an independent show, and not like a segment of Showmatch. It premiered on May 7, 2011, hosted by José María Listorti and Denise Dumas.

Marcelo Tinelli continued as the host of Bailando por un Sueño, the only competition included on the famous Argentinean show, Showmatch, unlike 2006 and 2007, when Cantando por un Sueño was a part of the show too, and was hosted by Tinelli.

The judges for this season were singer Valeria Lynch, music producer Óscar Mediavilla, journalist Marcelo Polino, and singer Patricia Sosa. Famous singer Paz Martínez and artistic director Reina Reech served as replacements during some weeks of the show.

Sixteen couples started the competition, and on December 18, 2011, famous singer Patricio Giménez (brother of Susana Giménez) and professional singer and partner Priscila Juárez, were crowned as the winners, against comedian Álvaro Navia and Ana Paula Rodríguez, during the finale.

Meanwhile, the semi-finalists during this season were model and comedian Belén Francese and Augusto Álvarez, and former contestants of the first season of Soñando por Bailar, Andrea López and Jonathan González. López and González were eliminated against Giménez and Juárez during the first semi-final, while Francese and Álvarez were eliminated against Navia and Rodríguez, during the second semi-final.

Couples

Scoring chart

Red numbers indicate the lowest score for each week.
Green numbers indicate the highest score for each week.
 indicates the couple eliminated that week.
 indicates the couple was saved by the public.
 indicates the couple was saved by the jury.
 indicates the winning couple.
 indicates the runner-up couple.
 indicates the semi-finalists couples.

Weekly scores and songs

Round 1
Unless indicated otherwise, individual judges scores in the charts below (given in parentheses) are listed in this order from left to right: Patricia Sosa, Marcelo Polino, Óscar Mediavilla, Valeria Lynch.

 Key
  – The couple was saved by the judges
  – The couple was saved by the public vote
  – The couple was eliminated

Secret vote: Valeria Lynch

Running order

Round 2
Paz Martínez replaced Valeria Lynch, scoring the first five couples.

Secret vote: Patricia Sosa

Running order

Round 3

Secret vote: Oscar Mediavilla

Running order

Round 4

Secret vote: Patricia Sosa

Running order

Round 5

Secret vote: Valeria Lynch

Running order

Round 6
Mariana "Loly" Antoniale was replaced by Nazarena Vélez during this round.

Secret vote: Patricia Sosa

Running order

Round 7

Secret vote: Valeria Lynch

Running order

Round 8
The couples performed with a special guest during this round.

Secret vote: Patricia Sosa

Running order

Round 10

Secret vote: Oscar Mediavilla

Running order

References 

2010s Argentine television series
2011 Argentine television series debuts